Singing Star is the Indian Marathi language singing reality show. It has aired on Sony Marathi since 21 August 2020 and ended on 22 November 2020.

Concept
It was a celebrity singing reality show where celebrity was the participants and they were paired along with singer to offer some variety of songs.

Series overview

Contestants and singers
 Sankarshan Karhade and Ketaki Bhave-Joshi
 Swanandi Tikekar and Rohit Raut
 Yashoman Apte and Sharayu Date
 Archana Nipankar and Rahul Saxena
 Aarti Wadabgalkar and Tyagraj Khadilkar
 Aastad Kale and Savani Ravindra
 Jui Gadkari and Harshavardhan Wavre
 Ajay Purkar and Amruta Natu
 Abhijit Kelkar and Kavita Raam
 Purniemaa Dey and Mandar Apte
 Anshuman Vichare and Juilee Joglekar
 Girija Oak and Hrishikesh Kamerkar

References 

Sony Marathi original programming
Marathi-language television shows